Harnath Singh Yadav (born 1 April 1941) is an Indian politician. He is a Member of Parliament elect, representing Uttar Pradesh in the Rajya Sabha the upper house of India's Parliament representing the Bharatiya Janata Party. He belongs from Gopalpur village [yaduvanshi's-dominated] of Mainpuri district.

Harnath Singh Yadav is a former MLC who hails from Mainpuri and later moved to Etah. A former RSS zila pracharak, he later served as BJP state general secretary. He is considered close to former CM Kalyan Singh. He was elected an MLC as an independent in 1996 and later with Samajwadi Party support in 2002 from Agra Graduates constituency. He lost the council election in 2014, then he joined BJP. In the 2017 UP elections, BJP appointed him in-charge of Yadav-dominated district Mainpuri.

References

1941 births
Living people
Members of the Uttar Pradesh Legislative Council
Rajya Sabha members from Uttar Pradesh
Bharatiya Janata Party politicians from Uttar Pradesh
People from Mainpuri